Walter Henry Gray (August 20, 1898 – December 4, 1973) was bishop of the Episcopal Diocese of Connecticut from 1951 to 1969. He had served previously as suffragan from 1940 to 1945 and coadjutor from 1945 to 1951.

Early life and education
Gray was born on August 20, 1898, in Richmond, Virginia, the son of William Cole Gray and Irena Hanswood Talley. He served in the US Army during World War I. After the war he studied at the College of William & Mary and the Law School of the University of Richmond, after which he was admitted to the Virginia State Bar in 1925. In 1928 he graduated with a Bachelor of Divinity from the Virginia Theological Seminary.

Priest
Gray was ordained deacon on June 8, 1928, and priest on February 17, 1929. He served as assistant rector of St John's Church in West Hartford, Connecticut, from 1928 till 1932. Later, in 1932, he became Dean of the Pro-Cathedral of the Nativity in Bethlehem, Pennsylvania. In 1937 he transferred to Hartford, Connecticut, to become Dean of Christ Church Cathedral.

Bishop
Gray was elected Suffragan Bishop of Connecticut in 1940. He was consecrated on November 12, 1940, by Presiding Bishop Henry St. George Tucker. He was elected Bishop Coadjutor on October 2, 1945, and became succeeded as Bishop of Connecticut on January 15, 1951. As Bishop of Connecticut he was involved in the Interracial Commission and Interfaith Housing. He was also a prominent leader of the 1948, 1958 and 1968 Lambeth Conferences. He is the author of the "Gray Report" which talked about overseas missions. Gray retired on August 30, 1969. He died a few years later on December 4, 1973, in Hartford, Connecticut.

See also 
List of bishops of the Episcopal Church in the United States of America

External links 
Online biography

1898 births
1973 deaths
Episcopal Church in Connecticut
20th-century American Episcopalians
Episcopal bishops of Connecticut
20th-century American clergy